Nanjing Municipal Museum, the city museum of Nanjing, is a comprehensive museum of history and art, located inside Chaotian Palace. The museum was formally established in 1978 and is a key historical and cultural site.

With rich and exquisite cultural relics, the museum holds exhibitions such as “Treasures in Nanjing Municipal Museum”, “the Feature of the Six Dynasties”, “Nanjing: The Capital of Ming Dynasty ”, “Nanjing: A Home for Royalty”, “Seven Overseas Voyages by Zheng He”, “Archaeological Achievements in Ten Years ”, etc.

See also
 Nanjing Museum
 List of museums in China

References

External links 
 

Museums in Nanjing
1978 establishments in China
Museums established in 1978
National first-grade museums of China